Maghera railway station was on the Derry Central Railway which ran from Magherafelt to Macfin Junction in Northern Ireland.

History

The station was opened by the Derry Central Railway on 18 December 1880. It was taken over by the Northern Counties Committee in September 1901.

The station closed to passengers on 28 August 1950 by the Ulster Transport Authority.  The station served Maghera in County Londonderry.

References 

Disused railway stations in County Londonderry
Railway stations opened in 1880
Railway stations closed in 1950
Maghera, County Londonderry
Railway stations in Northern Ireland opened in the 19th century